Table may refer to:

 Table (furniture), a piece of furniture with a flat surface and one or more legs
 Table (landform), a flat area of land
 Table (information), a data arrangement with rows and columns
 Table (database), how the table data arrangement is used within databases
 Calligra Tables, a spreadsheet application
 Mathematical table
 Table (parliamentary procedure)
 Tables (board game)
 Table, surface of the sound board (music) of a string instrument
 Al-Ma'ida, the fifth surah of the Qur'an, usually translated as “The Table”
 Water table

See also
 Spreadsheet, a computer application
 Table cut, a type of diamond cut
 The Table (disambiguation)
 Table Mountain (disambiguation)
 Table Rock (disambiguation)
 Tabler (disambiguation)
 Tablet (disambiguation)